Andrew Marton (born Endre Marton; 26 January 1904 – 7 January 1992) was a Hungarian-American film director. In his career, he directed 39 films and television programs, and worked on 16 as a second unit director, including the chariot race in Ben Hur (1959).

Life and career
Marton was born in Budapest, Hungary. After high-school graduation in 1922 he was taken by Alfréd Deésy to Vienna to work at Sascha-Film, mostly as an assistant editor. After a few months, he rose the attention of director Ernst Lubitsch, who convinced him to try Hollywood. Marton returned to Europe in 1927, and worked as the main editor of the Tobis company in Berlin, and later as an assistant director in Vienna. He directed his Two O'Clock in the Morning, first feature film, in 1929 in Great Britain. He joined a German expedition to Tibet in 1934, where he filmed Demon of the Himalayas. Marton cited that he was Jewish as a reason that the film could not be released with his name as director, citing a conversation he had had with Nazi Propaganda Minister Joseph Goebbels.

After returning to Hungary, he directed his only Hungarian movie in 1935 in Budapest. Between 1936 and 1939, he worked with Alexander Korda in London. After the outbreak of World War II, he moved to the United States. During the 1940s and 1950s, he worked mostly for MGM Studios. In 1954, he founded his own production company with Ivan Tors, Louis Meyer and László Benedek. Ray worked as both as a feature film director and as a second unit director in many big budget epic films. On 55 Days at Peking, Marton went from second unit direction to act as one of the film's uncredited additional directors, devising the film's opening sequence.

Marton was active until the middle of the 1970s. On January 7, 1992, he died of pneumonia in Santa Monica, California.

Legacy
The works of Andrew Marton are focused on exoticism, nature, and spectacle. Beside feature films, he was also notable in television, creating several nature films and supervising episodes of series like Flipper and Daktari. Remembered for cinematic moments like the chariot race of Ben Hur, or the battle scenes of A Farewell to Arms, he worked as second unit director for Hollywood directors, including William Wyler, Fred Zinneman, Joseph Mankiewicz and Mike Nichols. Director John Landis referred to Marton as his mentor.

Selected filmography

Director

 Two O'Clock in the Morning (1929), GB
 The Night Without Pause (1931)
 North Pole, Ahoy (1934)
 Demon of the Himalayas (1935), D
 Miss President (1935)
 Wolf's Clothing (1936)
 Secret of Stamboul (1936)
 School for Husbands (1937)
 A Little Bit of Heaven (1940)
 Gentle Annie (1944)
 Gallant Bess (1946)
 King Solomon's Mines (1950), USA
 Storm over Tibet (1951), USA
 The Wild North (1952), USA
 The Devil Makes Three (1952)
 Men of the Fighting Lady (1954)
 Gypsy Colt (1954)
 Prisoner of War (1954)
 Green Fire (1954), USA
 Seven Wonders of the World (1956), USA
 Underwater Warrior (1958)
 Oh Islam (1961), Egypt
 It Happened in Athens (1962)
 The Longest Day (1962), USA
 The Thin Red Line (1964), USA
 Crack in the World (1965), USA
 Clarence, the Cross-Eyed Lion (1965)
 Birds Do It (1966)
 Africa Texas Style (1967)

Second unit director
 The Seventh Cross (1944), USA
 Ben Hur (1959), USA
 Cleopatra (1963), USA
 Kampf um Rom I (1968–69), Germany
 Catch-22 (1970), USA
 Kelly's Heroes (1970), USA
 The Day of the Jackal (1973), USA
 The Message (1976), aka Mohammad, Messenger of God

Editor
 Eternal Love (1929), USA
 The Song Is Ended (1930)
 Him or Me (1930)
 Shadows of the Underworld (1931)
 I Go Out and You Stay Here (1931)
 A Tremendously Rich Man (1932)
 The Rebel (1932)
 Five from the Jazz Band (1932)
 The Prodigal Son (1934)

References

External links
 
 Biography on allmovie.com
 Biography on answers.com
 Andrew Marton papers, Margaret Herrick Library, Academy of Motion Picture Arts and Sciences

1904 births
1992 deaths
American film directors
German-language film directors
Hungarian film directors
American people of Hungarian-Jewish descent
Hungarian Jews
Burials at Westwood Village Memorial Park Cemetery
Mountaineering film directors
Hungarian emigrants to the United States